Dindymene is an extinct genus of trilobites in the order Phacopida. It contains two species, D. didymograpti, and D. hughesiae.

References

External links 
 Dindymene at the Paleobiology Database

Encrinuridae genera
Fossils of the Czech Republic
Ordovician trilobites